Goodyera rubicunda, commonly known as the giant jewel orchid, is a species of orchid that is native to parts of India, Asia, Southeast Asia, New Guinea, Queensland and some Pacific Islands where it grows in damp forest and rainforest. It has between three and six large, egg-shaped leaves and up to ten dull pink and white resupinate flowers that are hairy on the outside.

Description 
Flowering occurs from September to October in Australia.

Taxonomy and naming
The giant jewel orchid was first formally described in 1825 by Carl Ludwig Blume who gave it the name Neottia rubicunda and published the description in Bijdragen tot de Flora van Nederlandsch Indie. In 1839, John Lindley changed the name to Goodyera rubicunda. The specific epithet (rubicunda) is a Latin word meaning "reddish", "ruddy" or "red".

Distribution and habitat
Goodyera rubicunda grows in damp places in forest. It is found in China north-eastern India, Indonesia, Japan (including the Ryukyu Islands), Malaysia, New Guinea, the Philippines, Vietnam, Queensland and some Pacific islands.

References

External links 
 

Orchids of Queensland
Orchids of China
Orchids of India
Orchids of Indonesia
Orchids of Japan
Orchids of Malaysia
Orchids of New Guinea
Orchids of the Philippines
Orchids of Vietnam
Plants described in 1825
rubicunda